Antipodocottus elegans or the dwarf sculpin is a species of marine ray-finned fish belonging to the family Cottidae, the typical sculpins.  Most commonly found in the benthic zone around depths of 400 meters, A. elegans is found almost exclusively near Wollongong in New South Wales, Australia.

References

External links

elegans
Fish of Australia
Fish described in 1984
Taxa named by Ronald Fricke